The Andrew Carnegie Birthplace Museum is a biographical museum in Dunfermline, Fife, Scotland, dedicated to the life of Scottish-American industrialist and philanthropist Andrew Carnegie, "one of the great Scots of the 19th century.". The museum is operated by the Carnegie Dunfermline Trust and is housed in a category B listed building. The museum site includes the original 18th-century weavers cottage in which Andrew Carnegie was born and a memorial hall added by James Shearer in 1928.

Andrew's wife, Louise Whitfield Carnegie, purchased the cottage in 1895 from William Templeman using a legacy bequeathed to her from her grandfather. Upon the creation of the Carnegie Dunfermline Trust in 1903 the cottage was looked after by the trust and opened to visitors in 1908.

In October 2019 the museum became the first Scottish institution to win the Family Friendly Museum Award.

Collections 
The majority of the initial collection items of the museum were donated by Louise Whitfield Carnegie in 1928 and came directly from the Carnegie family homes in the US and Scotland. These included art, photographs and archival materials. Additional collection items, deemed too precious donate when the museum was established, were bequeathed to the museum following the death of Louise Whitfield Carnegie. There are various kinds of exhibits being showcased relating to Natural History, the Arts, and the Sciences. Some objects of note include portraits of the Carnegie family, and Architectural Drawings of the Carnegie Institute in Pennsylvania.

References

External links 
 Andrew Carnegie Birthplace Museum website
 Carnegie Dunfermline Trust website

Biographical museums in Scotland